"Salute to a Switchblade" is a song written and recorded by American country music artist Tom T. Hall. It was released in June 1970 as the only single from the album, I Witness Life. The song peaked at number 8 on the U.S. country singles chart and at number 14 on the Canadian country singles chart.

Chart performance

References 
 

1970 singles
Tom T. Hall songs
Songs written by Tom T. Hall
Song recordings produced by Jerry Kennedy
Mercury Records singles